Abbottina is a genus of ray-finned fish in the family Cyprinidae, the carps and minnows. They are native to eastern Asia (China, Korea, Japan, and Vietnam). The genus was named for the American zoologist James Fisher Abbott, student at Stanford University and later professor of English at Naval Academy Etajima and of zoology at Washington University in St. Louis.

Species
There are currently 5 recognized species in this genus:
Abbottina binhi Nguyễn, 2001
Abbottina lalinensis Huang & Li, 1995
Abbottina liaoningensis K. J. Qin, 1987
Abbottina obtusirostris (H. W. Wu & Ki. Fu. Wang, 1931)
Abbottina rivularis (Basilewsky, 1855) - Chinese false gudgeon

References 

 
Taxa named by David Starr Jordan
Taxa named by Henry Weed Fowler